Walsh is a Statutory Town in Baca County, Colorado, United States.  The population was 546 at the 2010 census, down from 723 at the 2000 census.

A post office called Walsh has been in operation since 1926.  The community was named after one Mr. Walsh, a railroad official.

Geography
Walsh is located in eastern Baca County at  (37.386540, -102.278727) at an elevation of 3953'. U.S. Route 160 passes along the north edge of the town, leading west  to Springfield, the county seat, and east  to Johnson City, Kansas.

Climate

According to the Köppen Climate Classification system, Walsh has a cold semi-arid climate, abbreviated "BSk" on climate maps.

Demographics

As of the census of 2000, there were 723 people, 302 households, and 189 families residing in the town. The racial makeup of the town was 88.24% White, 1.38% Native American, 0.14% Asian, 6.50% from other races, and 3.73% from two or more races. Hispanic or Latino of any race were 14.80% of the population.

There were 302 households, out of which 29.1% had children under the age of 18 living with them, 52.6% were married couples living together, 7.6% had a female householder with no husband present, and 37.4% were non-families. 34.8% of all households were made up of individuals, and 18.9% had someone living alone who was 65 years of age or older.  The average household size was 2.31 and the average family size was 3.00.

In the town, the population was spread out, with 24.9% under the age of 18, 6.5% from 18 to 24, 23.9% from 25 to 44, 19.8% from 45 to 64, and 24.9% who were 65 years of age or older.  The median age was 41 years. For every 100 females, there were 96.5 males.  For every 100 females age 18 and over, there were 93.9 males.

The median income for a household in the town was $24,911, and the median income for a family was $32,574. Males had a median income of $22,344 versus $19,688 for females. The per capita income for the town was $14,846.  About 15.0% of families and 16.9% of the population were below the poverty line, including 21.6% of those under age 18 and 18.7% of those age 65 or over.

See also

Outline of Colorado
Index of Colorado-related articles
State of Colorado
Colorado cities and towns
Colorado municipalities
Colorado counties
Baca County, Colorado

References

External links

Town of Walsh official website
CDOT map of the Town of Walsh

Towns in Baca County, Colorado
Towns in Colorado